The Landwind X2 is a subcompact CUV produced by Chinese car manufacturer Landwind, an automobile marque owned by the Chinese automaker Jiangling Motor Holding, a joint venture between Aiways, Changan Auto and Jiangling Motors Corporation Group (JMCG).

Overview
The Landwind X2 debuted on the 2017 Shanghai Auto Show and was launched on the Chinese car market in Q2 2017. The Landwind X2 subcompact CUV was positioned right under the Landwind X7 compact CUV, and pricing of the ranges from 63,800 yuan and ends at 88,800 yuan. Engine options for the Landwind X2 is a 1.6 liter engine with 125hp and 150nm, mated to a five-speed manual transmission or a four-speed automatic transmission, powering the front wheels, with an additional 1.5 liter turbo engine added to the lineup later.

The design of the Landwind X2 resembles another existing vehicle, the Chang'an CS35 subcompact crossover, as both crossovers share the same platform from Changan. Landwind is a sub-brand of Jiangling Motors Holding, which was a joint venture by Jiangling Motors Group and Changan Auto before being joined by Aiways.

JMEV E400 and EVeasy EX5
The JMEV E400 is JMEV's first SUV. It was renamed as EVeasy EX5 in September 2019.

References

External links
Official website 

2010s cars
Cars introduced in 2017
Cars of China
Crossover sport utility vehicles
Landwind vehicles
Mini sport utility vehicles
Production electric cars